Veliki Berehi or Velyki Berehy (Hungarian Nagybereg) is a village in Zakarpattia Oblast (province) of western Ukraine. Administratively, the village belongs to the Berehove Raion, Zakarpattia Oblast. Historically, the name originates in the Hungarian berek and was first mentioned as Beregu.

Population
In 1910, it had a population of 2,133, mostly Hungarians. , the population includes 2,674 inhabitants, of which 2,240 (80 percent) are Hungarians.

References 

Villages in Berehove Raion